Kvanxidatl is a small village in the Botlikh district in Dagestan, Russia

Geographical location 
It is located 15 km northeast of the Botlikh village, on the Unsatlen River.

History 
In 1947, the village was liquidated, and the population was relocated to the village of Konkhidatli, Vedeno district. Restored in 1958 in connection with the return of residents. However, part of the villagers did not return, but founded the village of Dzerzhinskoye in the Khasavyurt district on the site of the former Kumyk farm Adil-otar.

Language 
Villagers speak Andean. In 1981, a linguistic expedition Department of Structural and Applied Linguistics of the Faculty of Philology MSU led by A. E. Kibrika

References

Sources 
 Photo of the village

Rural localities in Botlikhsky District